Eumicrotremus barbatus, the papillose lumpsucker, is a species of marine ray-finned fish belonging to the family Cyclopteridae, the lumpfishes or lumpsuckers, found in the north Pacific Ocean. This species is characterized by the following unique apomorphies: teeth in the outer row at symphysis of premaxillae fuse with premaxillae, teeth at symphysis of dentary fuse among themselves and with dentary, forming the regular cutting edge; there are numerous barbs on the head and body; the bony plaques located in centers of connective tissue tubercles leaving the edges free. This species was originally classified in the monospecific genus Georgimarinus, but it is now regared as a species within Eumicrotremus.

References

barbatus
Fish described in 1995